Malcolm Stuart Kennedy (30 October 1892 – 2 January 1918) was an Australian rules footballer who played with Melbourne in the Victorian Football League (VFL). He was killed in action on active service in Belgium in World War I.

Family
Malcolm was the son of Robert Kennedy and Clementina Sobieska Stuart Kennedy (née Robertson), he was born on 30 October 1892 in Kew, Victoria.

Education
He attended Camberwell Grammar School, Queen's College, Hobart (which was later absorbed by The Hutchins School), University of Melbourne, and Royal Military College, Duntroon.

Sportsman
Recruited from Blackburn, aged 18, he played his first senior VFL match for Melbourne, against Collingwood, at Victoria Park on 3 June 1911. Melbourne lost by a six points; Kennedy kicked one goal.

He went on to play a total of seventeen games for Melbourne; eleven games in twelve rounds in 1911, kicking four goals, and six games in seven rounds in 1912 (no goals). Before the 1912 season commenced, the VFL instituted the convention of all players wearing a distinctive, large, conspicuous, personal number on the back of their guernsey (to promote sales of The Football Record, which supplied lists of the player numbers); therefore, when Kennedy ran out on to the Melbourne Cricket Ground, on Saturday 27 April 1912, the first round of the 1912 VFL season, to play against Collingwood he was the first Melbourne player to wear the number 12 guernsey.

He played his last match against Essendon, at the Melbourne Cricket Ground, on the King's Birthday Holiday, Monday, 3 June 1912. In the reports of the day, there is no indication that he was either injured or played badly; and, further, none of the contemporary newspapers give any indication at all of any possible reason that might explain why that match was Kennedy's last game for Melbourne.

In 1913, he represented Duntroon at Australian rules football, rugby union, playing as a forward, and at cricket.

On 6 September 1913, at the second annual sports carnival of the Royal Military College, Kennedy came third in the finals of the 100 yards, 220 yards handicap, and 440 yards races, the heats having been conducted over the previous fortnight.

Professional soldier
He was in the second (1913) intake of cadets at Duntroon, announced on 13 January 1913. His Corps of Staff Cadets (CSC) number was 82.

Britain's declaration of war on Germany on 4 August, meant that Australia was also at war.

Due to the direct, personal representations of Lord Kitchener, the graduation of thirty of the cadets in the second intake, including Kennedy, were accelerated, and they were immediately given commissions as Lieutenants.

Fifteen of the thirty R.M.C. graduates were allotted to the infantry, to serve under Colonel John Monash, and the other fifteen, including Kennedy and Robert Harold Nimmo (later, Lieutenant General Nimmo), were allotted to the Light Horse.

It was announced in The Sydney Morning Herald of 24 March 1916, that Captain M.S. Kennedy of the Light Horse had "passed the course of instruction under the Defence Act for the rank of major". However his military record has no record of such training; it seems that there was a misunderstanding as his military record (p. 14) shows that Kennedy "obtained "distinguished" pass at the School of Musketry Hythe, [and] also qualified in mechanism of the Lewis Gun" in February 1916.

Remembered
His name appears with 41 others on a memorial honour board, displayed at Duntroon, commemorating the memory of the 42 graduates of the Royal Military College of Australia who died during their military service in the Great War. and the Greensborough District's War Memorial Cenotaph.

At evensong on Friday 23 November, a memorial tablet dedicated to Malcolm Kennedy was unveiled by the Anglican Archbishop of Melbourne, Harrington Lees, on the eastern wall of St Paul's Cathedral, Melbourne. The tablet's inscription read:

See also

 List of Victorian Football League players who died on active service

Notes

Footnotes

References

 
 
 Australian War Memorial: Red Cross Wounded and Missing Records: Captain Malcolm Stuart Kennedy
 Australian World War I Service Record: Malcolm Stuart Kennedy
 Australian War Memorial Roll of Honour – Malcolm Stuart Kennedy
 Demonwiki Biography: Mal Kennedy
 Australians on Service: Died of Wounds: Kennedy, Malcolm Stuart, The Argus, (Saturday, 19 January 1918), p.16.
 Biographical information supplied to the authorities by Robert Kennedy (Malcolm Stuart Kennedy's father) after the war.
 Team Photograph: First XVIII R.M.C. Duntroon 1913.

1892 births
1918 deaths
Melbourne Football Club players
Australian military personnel killed in World War I
People educated at Camberwell Grammar School
Royal Military College, Duntroon graduates
Australian rules footballers from Melbourne
Military personnel from Melbourne
Australian Army officers
People from Kew, Victoria